Serramanna, Serra Manna (wide range) in sardinian language,  is a comune (municipality) in the Province of South Sardinia in the Italian region Sardinia, located about  northwest of Cagliari and about  south of Sanluri.

Serramanna borders the following municipalities: Nuraminis, Samassi, Sanluri, Serrenti, Villacidro, Villasor.

Demographic evolution

References

External links

 www.comune.serramanna.ca.it/
 www.serramanna.altervista.org 

Cities and towns in Sardinia